Berwick Academy may refer to:

Berwick Academy, Berwick-upon-Tweed, an upper school in  Berwick-upon-Tweed, Northumberland, England
Berwick Academy (Maine),  a college preparatory school in South Berwick, Maine, United States

See also
Berwick (disambiguation)
Berwick High School (disambiguation)